Anbuh (also Romanized as Anbūh; also known as Anbukh and Anbūn) is a village in Kalisham Rural District, Amarlu District, Rudbar County, Gilan Province, Iran. At the 2006 census, its population was 613, in 177 families.

References 

Populated places in Rudbar County